The 12.7 cm/40 Type 89 naval gun (40 Kokei Hachikyu Shiki 12 Senchi 7 Kokakuho) was a Japanese anti-aircraft (AA) gun introduced before World War II. It was the Imperial Japanese Navy's standard heavy AA gun during the war.

The Type 89 was adopted by the IJN on February 6, 1932, and was the primary anti-aircraft gun on new aircraft carriers, battleships and cruisers, most commonly installed in twin gun mounts. It was used as the primary armament of the Matsu-class destroyers. As IJN ships were upgraded in the 1930s and 1940s, older AA guns such as 8 cm/40 3rd Year Type naval gun and 12 cm/45 10th Year Type naval guns were replaced with Type 89s.

Notes

References

External links

 12.7 cm/40 Type 89 on navweaps.com

World War II naval weapons
Naval guns of Japan
127 mm artillery
Military equipment introduced in the 1930s